The 1967 Arkansas State Indians football team represented Arkansas State College—now known as Arkansas State University—as a member of the Southland Conference during the 1967 NCAA College Division football season. Led by fifth-year head coach Bennie Ellender, the Indians compiled an overall record of 4–5 with a mark of 2–2 in conference play, placing third in the Southland.

Schedule

References

Arkansas State
Arkansas State Red Wolves football seasons
Arkansas State Indians football